Nasal septum deviation is a physical disorder of the nose, involving a displacement of the nasal septum. Some displacement is common, affecting 80% of people, mostly without their knowledge.

Signs and symptoms 
The nasal septum is the bone and cartilage in the nose that separates the nasal cavity into the two nostrils. The cartilage is called the quadrangular cartilage and the bones comprising the septum include the maxillary crest, vomer, and the perpendicular plate of the ethmoid. Normally, the septum lies centrally, and thus the nasal passages are symmetrical. A deviated septum is an abnormal condition in which the top of the cartilaginous ridge leans to the left or the right, causing obstruction of the affected nasal passage. 

It is common for nasal septa to depart from the exact centerline; the septum is only considered deviated if the shift is substantial or causes problems. By itself, a deviated septum can go undetected for years and thus be without any need for correction.

Symptoms of a deviated septum include infections of the sinus and sleep apnea, snoring, repetitive sneezing, facial pain, nosebleeds, mouth breathing, difficulty with breathing and mild to severe loss of the ability to smell. Only more severe cases of a deviated septum will cause symptoms of difficulty breathing and require treatment.

Causes
It is most frequently caused by impact trauma, such as by a blow to the face. It can also be a congenital disorder, caused by compression of the nose during childbirth. Deviated septum is associated with genetic connective tissue disorders such as Marfan syndrome, Homocystinuria and Ehlers–Danlos syndrome.

Diagnosis
Nasal septum deviation is the most common cause of nasal obstruction. A history of trauma to the nose is often present including trauma from the process of birth or microfractures. A medical professional, such as an otorhinolaryngologist (ears, nose, and throat doctor), typically makes the diagnosis after taking a thorough history from the affected person and performing a physical examination. Imaging of the nose is sometimes used to aid in making the diagnosis as well.

Treatment
Medical therapy with nasal sprays including decongestants, antihistamines, or nasal corticosteroid sprays is typically tried first before considering a surgical approach to correct nasal septum deviation. Medication temporarily relieves symptoms, but does not correct the underlying condition. Non-medical relief can also be obtained using nasal strips.

A minor surgical procedure known as septoplasty can cure symptoms related to septal deviations. The surgery lasts roughly one hour and does not result in any cosmetic alteration or external scars. Nasal congestion, pain, drainage or swelling may occur within the first few days after the surgery. Recovery from the procedure may take anywhere from 2 days to 4 weeks to heal completely. Septal bones never regrow. If symptoms reappear they are not related to deviations. Reappearance of symptoms may be due to mucosal metaplasia of the nose.

Currently, the most gentle and effective treatment is laser septo-chondroplasty for the septal cartilage segment deformity and ultrasound septoplasty – effective for the septal cartilage and bone deformation.

Complications of septoplasty
Adhesions and synechiae between septal mucosa and lateral nasal wall
Dropped nasal tip due to resection of the caudal margin
External nasal deformity
Incomplete correction with persistent nasal symptoms
Nasal septum perforation due to bilateral trauma of the mucoperichondrial flaps opposite each other.
Saddle nose due to over-resection of the dorsal wall of the septal cartilage
Scarring inside the nose and nose bleeding
Septal hematoma and septal abscess.

See also
 Nasal septum perforation

References

External links 

Nose disorders
Injuries